This is a list of Italian television related events from 2007.

Events
6 January 2007 - Olympic silver medal long jumper Fiona May and her partner Raimondo Todaro win the third season of Ballando con le stelle.
19 April - Milo Coretti wins the seventh season of Grande Fratello.
23 November - Actress and showgirl Maria Elena Vandone and her partner Samuel Peron win the fourth season of Ballando con le stelle.

Debuts

International
8 October - /  Franny's Feet (Rai 2) (2003–2010)

Television shows

Rai

Drama 

 Rino Gaetano, Ma il cielo è sempre più blu (But the sky is more and more blue) – biopic by Marco Turco, with Claudio Santamaria in the title role, Kasia Smutniak and Laura Chiatti; 2 episodes. The movie is criticized by the family of the singer, for his depiction as an alcoholic and the insertion of an imaginary love story.
 Il pirata: Marco Pantani – biopic by Claudio Bonivento, with Rolando Ravello in the title role and Nicoletta Romanoff.

Variety 

 Ballando con le stelle (2005–present)

Mediaset
Grande Fratello (2000–present)

Ending this year

Births

Deaths

See also
List of Italian films of 2007

References